Barrow Green Court is a Grade I listed house near Oxted, Surrey, England.

The house was built in the early-17th century, with mid-18th century alterations and 20th-century extensions.

Since the 1970s, the businessman Mohamed Al-Fayed has lived at Barrow Green Court.

References

Grade I listed buildings in Surrey
Houses completed in the 17th century
Oxted